Greece is scheduled to compete at the 2024 Summer Olympics in Paris from 26 July to 11 August 2024. Greek athletes have appeared in every Summer Olympic Games of the modern era, alongside Australia, France, Great Britain, and Switzerland. As the progenitor nation of the Olympic Games and in keeping with the tradition, Greece will enter first at Place du Trocadéro during the parade of nations segment of the opening ceremony.

Competitors
The following is the list of number of competitors in the Games.

Athletics

Greek track and field athletes achieved the entry standards for Paris 2024, either by passing the direct qualifying mark (or time for track and road races) or by world ranking, in the following events (a maximum of 3 athletes each):

Track and road events

Shooting

Greek shooters achieved quota places for the following events based on their results at the 2022 and 2023 ISSF World Championships, 2022, 2023, and 2024 European Championships, 2023 European Games, and 2024 ISSF World Olympic Qualification Tournament, if they obtained a minimum qualifying score (MQS) from 14 August 2022 to 9 June 2024.

References

Nations at the 2024 Summer Olympics
2024
2024 in Greek sport